Temperance Billiard Hall may refer to:

 Temperance Billiard Halls, a 1906 Lancashire company which built billiard halls in the north of England and London
 Temperance Billiard Hall, Fulham
 Temperance Billiard Hall, Chelsea
 Sedge Lynn public house, originally Temperance Billiard Hall, in Chorlton-cum-Hardy